This is a list of people trained as medical doctors who have worked in British media:
 Simon Brodkin
 David Bull
 Ellie Cannon
 Graham Chapman
 Anthony Clare
 Tony Gardner
 Ben Goldacre
 Fiona Godlee
 Mark Hamilton
 Phil Hammond
 Ernest Abraham Hart
 Jonty Heaversedge
 Harry Hill
 Richard Horton
 Sarah Jarvis
 Christian Jessen
 Hilary Jones
 James Le Fanu
 Rosemary Leonard
 Alan Maryon-Davis
 Pixie McKenna
 Jonathan Miller
 Radha Modgil
 Renée Hoenderkamp
 Michael J. Mosley
 Michael O'Donnell
 Raj Persaud
 Mark Porter
 George Rae
 Alice Roberts
 Paul Sinha
 Richard Smith
 Chris Steele
 Miriam Stoppard
 Hank Wangford
 Robert Winston

Lists of physicians
Media